Michael Anthony Powell (born November 10, 1963) is an American former track and field athlete, and the holder of the long jump world record. He is a two-time world champion and two-time Olympic silver medalist in this event. His world record of  has stood since 1991.

Biography

Background
Powell was born in Philadelphia, Pennsylvania. He attended Edgewood High School in West Covina, California, where he finished second in the high jump at the CIF California State Meet in 1981.  He went on to attend the University of California, Irvine, and later transferred to the University of California at Los Angeles.  He is a member of Alpha Phi Alpha fraternity.

Athletics career

Powell won the long jump silver medal at the 1988 Summer Olympics in Seoul.

At the 1991 World Championships in Athletics (Tokyo), on August 30, 1991, Powell broke Bob Beamon's almost 23-year-old long jump world record by 5 cm (2 inches), leaping . The world record still stands, making it the longest-standing long jump world record since records have been kept. His feat earned him the James E. Sullivan Award and BBC Overseas Sports Personality of the Year Award in 1991.

Powell again won the long jump silver medal at 1992 Summer Olympics in Barcelona. In addition to his famous 1991 victory, he won the long jump again at the 1993 World Championships in Athletics, and came third at the 1995 World Championships in Athletics.

Powell competed in the 1992–93 Foot Locker Slam Fest and successfully dunked from the free throw line.

After coming fifth in the long jump at the 1996 Olympics, Powell retired. He returned in 2001 with a goal of competing in the 2004 Olympics, but did not make the American team.

After retirement
Powell became an analyst for Yahoo! Sports Olympic Track & Field coverage.

He stated in July 2009 that he intended to return to competition with the aim of breaking Tapani Taavitsainen's Masters over-45 world record in the long jump.

Powell now coaches long jump at the Academy of Speed in Rancho Cucamonga, California.

At the Simplot Games on February 20, 2015 in an official announcement Powell stated that, at the age of 51, he would jump again in competition. On March 7, 2015 Powell entered the Athletics New Zealand Track and Field Championships, with every jump considered an attempt at the World Masters record. However, Powell sustained an injury in warm up and didn't actually compete. He later stated he will jump again in the future and now he has registered for the WMA in Tampere in July 2022.

In July 2016 his daughter Micha Powell was officially named to Canada's Olympic team.

References

External links
 
 
 

1963 births
Living people
American male long jumpers
James E. Sullivan Award recipients
World Athletics record holders
Athletes (track and field) at the 1988 Summer Olympics
Athletes (track and field) at the 1992 Summer Olympics
Athletes (track and field) at the 1996 Summer Olympics
Olympic silver medalists for the United States in track and field
University of California, Los Angeles alumni
University of California, Irvine alumni
UC Irvine Anteaters athletes
World Athletics Championships medalists
Track and field athletes from California
Track and field athletes from Philadelphia
Medalists at the 1992 Summer Olympics
Medalists at the 1988 Summer Olympics
World Athletics Championships athletes for the United States
Universiade medalists in athletics (track and field)
Goodwill Games medalists in athletics
BBC Sports Personality World Sport Star of the Year winners
Universiade gold medalists for the United States
World Athletics Championships winners
Competitors at the 1990 Goodwill Games
Competitors at the 1994 Goodwill Games